Walt Heyer (born October 25, 1940) is an American author, activist and speaker who underwent gender reassignment and lived for eight years as a trans woman before detransitioning in 1991.

Biography
Heyer was born in 1940 in Los Angeles. As a child, his grandmother made him a purple dress. When his parents discovered this, they would supervise all his visits and his father hit him. His uncle would sexually abuse him. After what he described as a misdiagnosis  of gender dysphoria, Walt Heyer underwent gender reassignment surgery and lived for eight years as a woman named Laura Jensen, before regretting and reversing his sex change. His experience led him to support the view "that transgender people often experience regret after transitioning, arguing that what transgender people actually need is 'psychiatric or psychological help.'" In a 2020 video, Heyer described the source of his gender confusion as "being cross-dressed, being disciplined with a hardwood floor plank, and being sexually molested."

Once "assistant manager of product planning for America Honda Motor Co", Heyer now works as an author and as a contributor to The Federalist and various other conservative media outlets. Left-leaning media watchdog Media Matters for America has criticized Heyer as "a source of extreme transphobic commentary."

Heyer's story is detailed in Ryan T. Anderson's 2018 book, When Harry Became Sally. The now defunct progressive news website ThinkProgress criticized the book for overemphasizing detransition and Heyer for "[creating] a career for himself of advocating against transgender equality based on his 'ex-trans' narrative."

Heyer's 2019 opinion column in USA Today was cited as one of the paper's ten most read articles of the year, and generated multiple published letters in response.

In June 2020, YouTube removed a video of a Heritage Foundation panel that included Heyer, citing its hate speech guidelines, a move which was criticized by various conservative media outlets including National Review and The Christian Post.

Bibliography
Trading my Sorrows (2006)
Perfected by Love (2009)
Paper Genders (2011)
Sex Change -- It's Suicide (2013)
A Transgender's Faith (2015)
Kid Dakota and the Secret at Grandma's House (2015)
Trans Life Survivors (2018)

References

American political activists
Living people
People who detransitioned
1940 births
Writers from Los Angeles
American social commentators
Activists from Los Angeles